The International Committee on Systematics of Prokaryotes (ICSP), formerly the International Committee on Systematic Bacteriology (ICSB), is the body that oversees the nomenclature of prokaryotes, determines the rules by which prokaryotes are named and whose Judicial Commission issues Opinions concerning taxonomic matters, revisions to the Bacteriological Code, etc.

Composition 

The ICSP consists of an executive board, the members of a decision-making committee (judicial commission) and members elected from member societies of the International Union of Microbiological Societies (IUMS). In addition, the ICSP has a number of subcommittees dealing with issues regarding the nomenclature and taxonomy of specific groups of prokaryotes.

Subcommittees 

The ICSP has a number of subcommittees dealing with issues regarding the nomenclature and taxonomy of specific groups of prokaryotes. These include the following: 
Aeromonadaceae, Vibrionaceae and related organisms 
Genera Agrobacterium and Rhizobium
Bacillus and related organisms
Bifidobacterium, Lactobacillus and related organisms
Genus Brucella; Burkholderia, Ralstonia and related organisms
Campylobacter and related bacteria
Clostridia and Clostridium-like organisms
Comamonadaceae and related organisms
Family Enterobacteriaceae
Flavobacterium- and Cytophaga-like bacteria
Gram-negative anaerobic rods
Family Halobacteriaceae
Family Halomonadaceae
Genus Leptospira
Genus Listeria
Methanogens
Suborder Micrococcineae
Families Micromonosporaceae, Streptosporangiaceae and Thermomonosporaceae
Class Mollicutes
Genus Mycobacterium
Nocardia and related organisms
Family Pasteurellaceae
Photosynthetic prokaryotes
Pseudomonas, Xanthomonas and related organisms
Suborder Pseudonocardineae
Staphylococci and streptococci 
Family Streptomycetaceae

Publications 

The ICSP is also integral to the production of the publication of the International Code of Nomenclature of Bacteria (the Bacteriological Code) and the International Journal of Systematic and Evolutionary Microbiology (IJSEM) (formerly the International Journal of Systematic Bacteriology, IJSB). IUMS has now agreed to transfer copyright of future versions of the International Code of Nomenclature of Bacteria (to be renamed the International Code of Nomenclature of Prokaryotes) to the ICSP.

References

Taxonomy (biology) organizations
Bacteriology
Prokaryote taxonomy